MJU may refer to:

Conference of Ministers of Justice
Maejo University
Minjiang University
Myongji University